Grove Street was a New Jersey Transit station in East Orange, Essex County, New Jersey, United States, along the Morris and Essex Line. The station was first built in 1901 by the Delaware, Lackawanna and Western Railroad (DL&W), and opened to the public in 1903. A second story was added to the eastbound station house after the DL&W elevated the tracks through East Orange in 1922. New Jersey Transit discontinued rail service to Grove Street on April 7, 1991. The entire station was demolished in 1995.

References

Former NJ Transit stations
Former Delaware, Lackawanna and Western Railroad stations
Former railway stations in New Jersey
Railway stations in the United States opened in 1903
Railway stations closed in 1991
1903 establishments in New Jersey
1991 disestablishments in New Jersey
Railway stations in Essex County, New Jersey
East Orange, New Jersey